W. Axl Rose (born William Bruce Rose Jr.; born February 6, 1962) is an American musician. He is best known for being the lead vocalist and lyricist of the hard rock band Guns N' Roses, and has been the band's sole constant member since its inception in 1985. Possessing a distinctive and powerful wide-ranging voice, Rose has been named one of the greatest singers of all time by various media outlets, including Rolling Stone and NME.

Born and raised in Lafayette, Indiana, Rose moved in the early 1980s to Los Angeles, where he became active in the local hard rock scene and joined several bands, including Hollywood Rose and L.A. Guns. In 1985, he co-founded Guns N' Roses, with whom he had great success and recognition in the late 1980s and early 1990s. Their first album, Appetite for Destruction (1987), has sold in excess of 30 million copies worldwide and is the best-selling debut album of all time in the U.S. with 18 million units sold. Its full-length follow-ups, the twin albums Use Your Illusion I and Use Your Illusion II (1991), were also widely successful; they respectively debuted at No.2 and No.1 on the Billboard 200 and have sold a combined 35 million copies worldwide.

After 1994, following the conclusion of their two-and-a-half-year Use Your Illusion Tour, Rose disappeared from public life for several years, while the band disintegrated due to personal and musical differences. As its sole remaining original member, he was able to continue working under the Guns N' Roses banner because he had legally obtained the band name. In 2001, he resurfaced with a new line-up of Guns N' Roses at Rock in Rio 3, and subsequently played periodic concert tours to promote the long-delayed Chinese Democracy (2008), which undersold the music industry's commercial expectations despite positive reviews upon its release. In 2012, Rose was inducted into the Rock and Roll Hall of Fame as a member of Guns N' Roses, though he declined to attend the event and requested exclusion from the Hall. In 2016, the same year as he toured with AC/DC, Rose partially reunited the "classic" lineup of Guns N' Roses and has since toured the world as part of the Not in This Lifetime... Tour.

Early life 

Axl Rose was born William Bruce Rose Jr. in Lafayette, Indiana, the oldest child of Sharon Elizabeth (née Lintner), then 16 years old and still in high school, and William Bruce Rose, then 20 years old. His father has been described as "a troubled and charismatic local delinquent," and the pregnancy was unplanned. His parents separated when Rose was approximately two years old, prompting his father to abduct and allegedly molest him before disappearing from Lafayette. His mother remarried Stephen L. Bailey, and changed her son's name to William Bruce Bailey. He has two younger siblings—a sister, Amy, and a half-brother, Stuart. As young children, both Rose and his siblings were regularly beaten. Until the age of 17, Rose believed Bailey was his natural father. He never met his biological father as an adult; William Rose Sr. was murdered in Marion, Illinois, in 1984 by a criminal acquaintance who was convicted even though the body was never recovered. Rose did not learn about the murder until years later.

The Bailey household was very religious; Rose and his family attended a Pentecostal church, where he was required to attend services three to eight times per week and even taught Sunday school. Rose later recalled an oppressive upbringing, stating, "We'd have televisions one week, then my stepdad would throw them out because they were Satanic. I wasn't allowed to listen to music. Women were evil. Everything was evil." He accused his stepfather of physically abusing him and his siblings and sexually abusing his sister. Rose found solace in music from an early age. He sang in the church choir from the age of five, and performed at services with his brother and sister under the name the Bailey Trio. At Jefferson High School, he participated in the school chorus and studied piano. A second baritone, Rose began developing "different voices" during chorus practice to confuse his teacher. He eventually formed a band with his friends, one of whom was Jeff Isbell, later known as Izzy Stradlin. He also befriended a girl called Anna Hoon, who would later introduce him to her little brother, Shannon.

At the age of 17, while going through insurance papers in his parents' home, Rose learned of his biological father's existence, and he unofficially readopted his birth name. However, he referred to himself only as W. Rose, because he did not want to share a first name with his biological father. Following the discovery of his true family origins, Rose became a local juvenile delinquent in Lafayette; he was arrested more than twenty times on charges such as public intoxication and battery, and served jail terms up to three months. After Lafayette authorities threatened to charge him as a habitual criminal, Rose moved to Los Angeles, California, in December 1982. After moving to Los Angeles, he became so engrossed in his band AXL that his friends suggested he call himself Axl Rose. He legally changed his name to W. Axl Rose prior to signing his contract with Geffen Records in March 1986.

Career

1983–1986: Early years 
Shortly after his arrival in Los Angeles, Rose met guitarist Kevin Lawrence outside The Troubadour in West Hollywood in March 1983 and joined his band Rapidfire. They recorded a five-song demo in May 1983 at Telstar Studios in Burbank, which, after years of legal action, was released as an EP, Ready to Rumble, in 2014. After parting ways with Lawrence, he formed the band Hollywood Rose with his childhood friend Izzy Stradlin, who had moved to Los Angeles in 1980, and 16-year-old guitarist Chris Weber. In January 1984, the band recorded a five-song demo featuring the tracks "Anything Goes", "Rocker", "Shadow of Your Love", and "Reckless Life", which was released in 2004 as The Roots of Guns N' Roses. Guitarist Slash and drummer Steven Adler, future members of Guns N' Roses, joined Hollywood Rose before the band's dissolution. Rose then joined L.A. Guns. While struggling to make an impact on the Hollywood music scene, Rose held down a variety of jobs, including the position of night manager at the Tower Records/Video location on Sunset Boulevard. Rose and Stradlin also smoked cigarettes for a scientific study at UCLA for the reported wages of $8 per hour.

In March 1985, encouraged by their manager Raz Cue, Rose and his former L.A. Guns bandmate Tracii Guns formed Guns N' Roses by merging their respective bands Hollywood Rose and L.A. Guns with Stradlin, drummer Rob Gardner and bassist Ole Beich. By June, after several line-up changes, the band consisted of Rose, lead guitarist Slash, rhythm guitarist Izzy Stradlin, bassist Duff McKagan, and drummer Steven Adler. The line-up debuted at The Troubadour and proceeded to play the L.A. club circuit, eventually building a devoted fan following. The band attracted the attention of several major record labels, before signing with Geffen Records in March 1986. The following December, they released the four-song EP Live ?!*@ Like a Suicide on the Geffen imprint UZI Suicide.

1987–1989: Breakthrough with Appetite for Destruction 
In July 1987, Guns N' Roses released their debut album Appetite for Destruction. Although the record received critical acclaim, it experienced a modest commercial start, selling as many as 500,000 copies in its first year of release. However, fueled by the band's relentless touring and the mainstream success of the single "Sweet Child o' Mine"—Rose's tribute to his then-girlfriend Erin Everly—the album rose to the No.1 position. To date, Appetite for Destruction has sold over 30 million copies worldwide, 18 million of which sold in the United States, making it the best-selling debut album of all time in the U.S.

During the band's performance at the Monsters of Rock festival in Castle Donington, England, in August 1988, two fans were crushed to death when many in the crowd of 107,000 began slam-dancing to "It's So Easy". Rose had halted the show several times to calm the audience. From then on, he became known for personally addressing disruptive fans and giving instructions to security personnel from the stage, at times stopping concerts to deal with issues in the crowd. In 1992, Rose stated, "Most performers would go to a security person in their organization, and it would just be done very quietly. I'll confront the person, stop the song: 'Guess what: You wasted your money, you get to leave.'" As a result of the deaths at Monsters of Rock, the festival was canceled the following year.

In November 1988, Guns N' Roses released the stopgap album G N' R Lies, which sold more than five million copies in the U.S. alone. The band – and Rose in particular – were accused of promoting racist and homophobic attitudes with the song "One in a Million", in which Rose warns "niggers" to "get out of my way" and complains about "faggots" who "spread some fucking disease". During the controversy, Rose defended his use of the racial slur by claiming, "it's a word to describe somebody that is basically a pain in your life, a problem. The word nigger doesn't necessarily mean black." In 1992, however, he conceded that the song reflected his initial and impressionable perspective when he first arrived in Los Angeles in his late teens, where he experienced culture shock to a lifestyle very much different from the conservative town he grew up in. Rose stated "I was pissed off about some black people [who] were trying to rob me. I wanted to insult those particular black people. I didn't want to support racism." In response to the allegations of homophobia, Rose said he considered himself "pro-heterosexual" but is "not against [homosexuals] doing what they want to do as long as it's not hurting anybody else and they're not forcing it upon [him]". He blamed this attitude on "bad experiences" with gay men, citing an attempted rape in his late teens and the alleged molestation by his biological father. The controversy led to Guns N' Roses being dropped from the roster of an AIDS benefit show in New York organized by the Gay Men's Health Crisis.

With the success of Appetite for Destruction and G N' R Lies, Rose found himself lauded as one of rock's most prominent frontmen. By the time he appeared solo on the cover of Rolling Stone in August 1989, his celebrity was such that the influential music magazine agreed to his absolute requirement that the interview and accompanying photographs would be provided by two of his friends, writer Del James and photographer Robert John. MTV anchorman Kurt Loder described Rose as "maybe the finest hard rock singer currently on the scene, and certainly the most charismatic".

1990–1993: International success with Use Your Illusion 
In early 1990, Guns N' Roses returned to the studio to begin recording the full-length follow-up to Appetite for Destruction. Recording sessions initially proved unproductive due to Steven Adler's struggle with drug addiction, which made him unable to perform and caused sessions to be delayed for several days at a time. Adler was fired the following July and replaced by Matt Sorum of The Cult. Keyboardist Dizzy Reed also joined the band that year at Rose's insistence. Sorum and Reed played their first show with Guns N' Roses at Rock in Rio 2 in January 1991. The group fired its long-time manager, Alan Niven, in May of that year; Rose reportedly forced the dismissal of Niven against the wishes of his bandmates by refusing to complete the new album until Niven was gone. He was replaced by roadie Doug Goldstein, whom Izzy Stradlin described as "the guy who gets to go over to Axl's at six in the morning after he's smashed his $60,000 grand piano out of the picture window".

In May 1991, still without an album to promote, the band embarked on the two-and-a-half-year Use Your Illusion Tour, which became known for its financial success and myriad controversial incidents that occurred during shows, including late starts, on-stage rantings and even riots. Rose received much criticism for his late appearances at concerts, sometimes taking the stage hours after the band was scheduled to perform. In July 1991, 90 minutes into a concert at the Riverport Amphitheater near St. Louis, after on-stage requests from Rose for security personnel to confiscate a fan's video camera, Rose himself dived into the crowd to seize it. After being pulled back on stage, he announced, "Well, thanks to the lame-ass security, I'm going home!" and departed, following which some 2,500 fans staged a riot, resulting in an estimated $200,000 in damages.

In September 1991, with enough material completed for two albums, Guns N' Roses released Use Your Illusion I and Use Your Illusion II, which debuted at No.2 and No.1 respectively on the Billboard 200, a feat not achieved by any other group. By the albums' release, however, Rose's relationships with his bandmates had become increasingly strained. His childhood friend Izzy Stradlin abruptly left the group in November 1991; he was replaced by Gilby Clarke of Kill For Thrills. Of his reasons for leaving, Stradlin said, "I didn't like the complications that became such a part of daily life in Guns N' Roses," citing the riot and Rose's chronic lateness as examples, as well as his new-found sobriety making it difficult to be around other bandmates' continued alcohol and substance abuse.

On April 20, 1992, Axl performed with Elton John at The Freddie Mercury Tribute Concert at Wembley Stadium singing Bohemian Rhapsody as a duet with Elton and also sang "We Will Rock You".

Another riot occurred in August 1992 at Montreal's Olympic Stadium, during a co-headlining tour with Metallica. Prior to Guns N' Roses' appearance, Metallica's set was cut short after singer-guitarist James Hetfield suffered second-degree burns in a pyrotechnics accident. However, Guns N' Roses was unable to go on stage early, because Rose once again was late arriving at the venue. Nearly an hour into their show, Rose complained of voice problems before walking off stage, following which a riot erupted in downtown Montreal, resulting in an estimated $400,000 in damages. In November of that year, Rose was convicted of property damage and assault in relation to the Riverport riot; he was fined $50,000 and received two years' probation.

Guns N' Roses played its final show of the Use Your Illusion Tour on July 17, 1993, at River Plate Stadium in Buenos Aires; it proved to be Rose's last live performance with the band for seven and a half years. The following August, Rose testified in court against Steven Adler, who had filed a lawsuit contending that he had been illegitimately fired. When the judge ruled against Rose, he agreed to an out-of-court settlement of $2,500,000 and 15% of the royalties for everything Adler recorded prior to his departure. In November of that year, Guns N' Roses released "The Spaghetti Incident?", a cover album of mostly punk songs, which proved less successful than its predecessors. Rose had included the hidden track "Look at Your Game, Girl", a song written by convicted murderer Charles Manson, which he intended as a personal message to his ex-girlfriend Stephanie Seymour. Controversy ensued, and the band subsequently pledged to donate any royalties to the son of one of Manson's victims.

1994–2000: Hiatus 
Without consultation from his bandmates, Rose did not renew Gilby Clarke's contract with the band in June 1994, as he claimed Clarke to be only a "hired hand." Tension between Rose and Slash reached a breaking point after the latter discovered that Rose had hired his childhood friend Paul "Huge" Tobias as Clarke's replacement. Although the band recorded material during this time, it was ultimately not used because, according to Rose, their lack of collaboration prevented them from producing their best work.

In August 1995, Rose legally left the band and created a new partnership under the band's name, a step he said he took "to salvage Guns not steal it". Rose reportedly purchased the full rights to the Guns N' Roses name in 1997. Slash claimed he and other bandmates signed away rights to the name before a show during the previous tour, with Axl delivering an ultimatum: they had to sign the name over to him or he would not perform. (In 2008, however, Rose said Slash's claims were false and that the alleged coercion would have rendered the contract legally untenable.)

Slash finally left Guns N' Roses in October 1996 due to his differences with Rose, while Matt Sorum was fired in June 1997 after an argument over Tobias's involvement in the band. Duff McKagan departed the band in August of that year, leaving Rose and Dizzy Reed as the only remaining band members of the Use Your Illusion era.

As the stability of Guns N' Roses collapsed, Rose withdrew from public view. The band never officially broke up, although it did not tour or perform for several years and no new material was released. Rose continued to recruit new musicians to replace band members who either left or were fired. By the late 1990s, he was considered to be a recluse, rarely making public appearances and spending most of his time in his mansion in Malibu. In various media reports, he was referred to as the "Howard Hughes of rock" and "rock's greatest recluse". Rose was said to spend his nights rehearsing and writing with the various new lineups of Guns N' Roses, working on the band's next album, Chinese Democracy.

2001–2011: Touring in support of Chinese Democracy 

After a warmup show in Las Vegas a few weeks earlier, Rose resurfaced with Guns N' Roses at Rock in Rio 3 on January 14, 2001, to commence the decade-long Chinese Democracy Tour, though the majority of its scheduled concerts over the next two years did not take place. A surprise appearance at the 2002 MTV Video Music Awards was followed by an incident in November when a riot erupted at Vancouver's General Motors Place after Rose failed to show up for a scheduled concert. When venue staff announced the cancellation, a riot broke out, resulting in an estimated $100,000 in damages. As the band's line-up continued to evolve, his constant bandmates were guitarist Richard Fortus, bassist Tommy Stinson, and keyboardists Dizzy Reed and Chris Pitman.

After the tour was cancelled by the promoter, Rose again withdrew from the public view. During this time, he joined Slash and Duff McKagan in a lawsuit against Geffen Records in an unsuccessful attempt to block the release of the Greatest Hits compilation album, and lent his voice to the 2004 video game Grand Theft Auto: San Andreas, as the DJ for the radio station, K-DST. In a rare interview in January 2006, Rose said "people will hear music this year." While Guns N' Roses toured extensively throughout 2006 and 2007, with several guest appearances by Izzy Stradlin, Chinese Democracy again failed to materialize. Rose did collaborate with his friend Sebastian Bach on his album Angel Down.

Fifteen years after its last album, in November 2008, Guns N' Roses released Chinese Democracy exclusively via the electronics retailer Best Buy. Rose did not contribute to the album's promotion; by December, he had reportedly been missing for at least two months and had not returned phone calls or other requests from his record label. In a subsequent interview, Rose said he felt he had not received the necessary support from Interscope Records. A year after the album's release, in December 2009, Guns N' Roses embarked on another two-and-a-half years of touring, including a headlining performance at Rock in Rio 4.

2012–present: Hall of Fame and regrouping; AC/DC 

Together with the other members of Guns N' Roses' classic lineup, Rose was inducted into the Rock and Roll Hall of Fame in 2012, their first year of eligibility. He did not attend the induction ceremony in April, however, as he had announced in an open letter three days prior. Rose, who had long been on bad terms with several of his former bandmates, wrote that the ceremony "doesn't appear to be somewhere I'm actually wanted or respected". He subsequently joined his band in residencies at The Joint in Las Vegas in 2012 and 2014, as part of the Appetite for Democracy Tour celebrating the anniversaries of Appetite for Destruction and Chinese Democracy. By mid-2014, the group's new album, recorded concurrently with Chinese Democracy, and a remix album were completed and pending release, but no new material emerged.

Rose and Slash reunited for the Not in This Lifetime... Tour, one of the most-anticipated reunion tours in rock history. Alongside Dizzy Reed and returning member Duff McKagan, who had previously made guest appearances with the band, they comprised two-thirds of the band's Use Your Illusion-era line-up, with Chinese Democracy-era members Richard Fortus and Frank Ferrer joining new member Melissa Reese to fill out the rest of the lineup. Rose shared a stage with Slash for the first time in nearly 23 years during the group's surprise performance at The Troubadour in April 2016, ahead of its headlining shows at Coachella. The tour was a massive success, and became the third highest-grossing concert tour of all time.

On April 16, 2016, Australian hard rock band AC/DC announced that Rose would be joining them and performing as the lead singer for the remainder of the band's Rock or Bust World Tour, after long-time lead vocalist Brian Johnson had to stop touring due to hearing problems. Subsequent reports indicated that guitarist Angus Young would be continuing the band with Rose as its official lead singer. This did not happen however; on September 30, 2020, AC/DC officially announced that Brian Johnson, along with Phil Rudd and Cliff Williams had returned to the band in 2018 and recorded an album, showing that Rose only stepped in to help finish the tour and that he was never brought in to replace Johnson.

In 2018, Rose appeared in an episode of New Looney Tunes as himself, singing an original song "Rock the Rock". In 2021, Rose again appeared as himself in a cartoon, this time Scooby-Doo and Guess Who?.

Rose and Guns N' Roses continued touring after the Not In This Lifetime... Tour, with the Guns N' Roses 2020 Tour. The group released two singles in 2021, "Absurd" and "Hard Skool", the first release of newly recorded material since 2008.

Personal life 

During Rose's late teens, a psychiatrist concluded that his delinquent behavior was evidence of psychosis. He was diagnosed with bipolar disorder. In addition, the psychiatrist made note of his high IQ. In a subsequent interview, Rose questioned the diagnosis altogether, stating,  
In contrast to his public image, Rose was not a heavy drug user, though he did not disavow the use of illicit substances entirely. Rose intentionally overdosed on painkillers in 1986 due to stress, stating "I couldn't take it. And I just grabbed the bottle of pills in an argument and just gulped them down and I ended up in the hospital." Rose's experience at the hospital inspired the lyrics to the Guns N' Roses song "Coma".

In the early 1990s, Rose became a staunch believer in homeopathic medicine, and began regularly undergoing past life regression therapy. He went public with his "uncovered memories" of being sexually abused by his biological father at the age of two, which he said had stunted his emotional growth: "When they talk about Axl Rose being a screaming two-year-old, they're right." His dislike of touring was caused in part by the various illnesses he contracted over time. He expressed his belief that these health problems were caused by him unconsciously lowering his own resistance as a form of "self-punishment". During the recordings of Chinese Democracy, Rose had a personal psychic who would look at photographs of potential employees to "read the auras" and decide if they should be hired.

In early 1986, Rose began a relationship with model Erin Everly, the daughter of singer Don Everly of The Everly Brothers. He wrote the song "Sweet Child o' Mine" for her, and Everly appeared in the accompanying music video. Rose and Everly were married on April 28, 1990, in Las Vegas. Less than a month later, Rose first filed for divorce. The couple later reconciled, during which Everly became pregnant. She suffered a miscarriage in October 1990, which deeply affected Rose, who had wanted to start a family. Everly left Rose the following November after an altercation; they annulled their marriage in January 1991.

In mid-1991, Rose became involved in a tumultuous high-profile relationship with supermodel Stephanie Seymour. During their relationship, Seymour appeared in the music videos for "Don't Cry" and "November Rain". Rose became deeply attached to Seymour's young son, Dylan, and tried to be a good father figure for the child, as there had been none in his own life. Seymour and Rose became engaged in February 1993, but separated three weeks later.

In response to an informal study that named him the 'World's Greatest Singer" based on a study of vocal ranges, Rose told Spin in 2014, "If I had to say who I thought the best singers were, I'd say first that I don't know there's a definitive answer as in my opinion it's subjective, and second that my focus is primarily rock singers. That said, I enjoy Freddie Mercury, Elvis Presley, Paul McCartney, Dan McCafferty, Janis Joplin, Michael Jackson, Elton John, Roger Daltrey, Don Henley, Jeff Lynne, Johnny Cash, Frank Sinatra, Jimmy Scott, Etta James, Fiona Apple, Chrissie Hynde, Stevie Wonder, James Brown and a ton of others (predominantly Seventies rock singers) and would rather hear any of them anytime rather than me!" Rose later cited Queen as his favorite band, and Mercury as his favorite singer.

On April 28, 2015, Rose sent a letter to Indonesian President Joko Widodo asking Widodo to remove the option of the death penalty in the case of the Bali Nine on grounds of humanitarianism. Rose then criticized Widodo for "ignoring the international outcry" after two were executed.

Rose has used Twitter to criticize various figures in the Trump administration, as well as other figures such as Apple CEO Tim Cook. On May 7, 2020, he used Twitter to criticize Treasury Secretary Steven Mnuchin for the Trump administration's handling of the COVID-19 pandemic, to which Mnuchin responded.

Legal issues
Rose was arrested over 20 times as a teenager in Indiana.

Rose and Slash were charged with statutory rape in 1985 after Rose had sex with a 15 year old girl named Michelle. After sleeping together, they had an argument and the girl left the house while she was still naked. Rose recalled the events: "This hippy chick wandered in and started fucking with our equipment trying to break stuff. So eventually she wound up running down Sunset naked, all dingy, and didn't even know her own name." After several weeks being fugitives hiding from police, the charges against the two were dropped due to lack of evidence.

In November 1987, Rose was arrested onstage after assaulting a security guard during a show. Rose was held backstage and allowed to leave if he apologized to the guards, but refused and was arrested.

In 1990, Rose was arrested for assault with a deadly weapon after allegedly hitting his next-door neighbor on the head with an empty wine bottle. Rose stated that the neighbor swung a wine bottle at him after he responded to her yelling. There had also been frequent incidents between the two over loud music being played. The run-ins with his neighbor inspired the lyrics to the song "Right Next Door To Hell" on Use Your Illusion I.

In 1992, Rose was arrested for his role in the Riverport Riot. Rose was found guilty of property damage and assault. He was fined $50,000 and given two years probation.

Rose was arrested in 1998 at an airport in Phoenix, Arizona for threatening an airport guard who was searching his luggage. He was charged with a misdemeanor count of disorderly conduct. Rose's publicist stated the incident was a "simple misunderstanding and that Rose was simply trying to protect a fragile memento he had been given."

Rose was arrested in Sweden in June 2006 for biting a security guard in the leg. The guard had confronted Rose who was arguing with a woman in a hotel lobby. Rose was deemed too intoxicated to be questioned right away by police. He was fined $5,500 for the incident as well as ordered to pay $1,360 in damages to the guard.

Lawsuits
Rose has been involved in many lawsuits involving fans, former bandmates, partners, and managers.

In 1992, the audience member who Rose attacked during the Riverport Riot sued him for $210,000 in damages. Rose settled out of court for $160,000.

After separating in 1993, Rose sued Stephanie Seymour claiming she assaulted him at a 1992 Christmas Party. Seymour filed a counter-suit claiming assault and battery by Rose. Both lawsuits were eventually settled out of court. In 1994, Rose's ex-wife Erin Everly filed a suit accusing Rose of physical and emotional abuse throughout their relationship. The lawsuit was settled out of court.

In 2004, Rose unsuccessfully sued to prevent the release of The Roots of Guns N' Roses, featuring early recordings from his band Hollywood Rose. Later that year, Rose was joined by former bandmates Slash and Duff McKagan in unsuccessfully suing to prevent the release of Greatest Hits. Slash and McKagan then sued Rose over publishing and songwriting credits in 2006, which Rose claimed were due to a clerical error when switching publishers.

In 2010, former band manager Irving Azoff sued Rose, seeking $1.87 million in unpaid fees related to touring. In a counter-suit, Rose alleged Azoff had deliberately mismanaged the band and sabotaged their record sales to force him to join his former bandmates for a reunion tour. Both cases were settled. According to Rose in 2011, part of the settlement agreement dictated that Rose and the current Guns N' Roses had to do a number of performances with Azoff's company Live Nation as the promoter.

In November 2010, Rose sued Activision, the publishers of the video game Guitar Hero III: Legends of Rock, for $20million, claiming Activision had violated an agreement with him to not include any reference to Slash or his band Velvet Revolver in the game in return for a license to use the song "Welcome to the Jungle". Instead, Rose noted that an image of Slash was used on the game's front cover. Rose's claim was summarily dismissed in February 2013, when the judge ruled that Rose had not brought suit on the contract, which relied on oral promises, within the two-year statute of limitations that began with the game's October 2007 release.

In March 2013, Rose was sued by an audience member who got hit by a microphone Rose threw into the crowd at the end of a show. Rose threatened legal action in 2014 over the release of  Rapidfire (his pre-Hollywood Rose band) recordings, keeping them from digital storefronts for a period of time. In August 2016, former Guns N' Roses keyboardist Chris Pitman sued Rose for $125,000 in unpaid wages. The two parties settled in November 2016.

Discography

with Guns N' Roses

Appetite for Destruction (1987)
G N' R Lies (1988)
Use Your Illusion I (1991)
Use Your Illusion II (1991)
"The Spaghetti Incident?" (1993)
Chinese Democracy (2008)

with Hollywood Rose
The Roots of Guns N' Roses (2004)

with Rapidfire
Ready to Rumble EP (2014)

Guest appearances
The Decline of Western Civilization Part II: The Metal Years – Original Motion Picture Soundtrack by various artists (1988; "Under My Wheels" ft. Alice Cooper, Slash and Izzy Stradlin)
The End of the Innocence by Don Henley (1989; "I Will Not Go Quietly")
Fire and Gasoline by Steve Jones (1989; "I Did U No Wrong")
Pawnshop Guitars by Gilby Clarke (1994; "Dead Flowers")
Anxious Disease by The Outpatience (1996; "Anxious Disease" ft. Slash)
Angel Down by Sebastian Bach (2007; "Back in the Saddle," "(Love Is) a Bitchslap," "Stuck Inside")
New Looney Tunes (2018, "Rock the Rock")

Filmography

References

External links 

1962 births
20th-century American male singers
20th-century American singers
21st-century American male singers
21st-century American singers
AC/DC members
American hard rock musicians
American heavy metal singers
American male singer-songwriters
American people convicted of assault
American people of German descent
American people of Scotch-Irish descent
American rock songwriters
 
Guns N' Roses members
Hollywood Rose members
L.A. Guns members
Living people
People charged with battery
People from Lafayette, Indiana
People from Malibu, California
Singers from Los Angeles
Singers with a five-octave vocal range
Singer-songwriters from California
Singer-songwriters from Indiana
People with bipolar disorder